Dichlorine trioxide, Cl2O3, is a chlorine oxide. It is a dark brown solid discovered in 1967 which is explosive even below 0 °C. It is formed by the low-temperature photolysis of ClO2 and is formed along with Cl2O6, Cl2 and O2. Its structure is believed to be OCl−ClO2 with possible isomers such as Cl−O−ClO2. The isomer having a structure of OCl–O–ClO would be the theoretical anhydride of chlorous acid.

References

Chlorine oxides
Chlorine(V) compounds
Sesquioxides
Substances discovered in the 1960s
Explosive chemicals